Mensuration may refer to:
Measurement
Theory of measurement
Mensuration (mathematics), a branch of mathematics that deals with measurement of various parameters of geometric figures and many more 
Forest mensuration, a branch of forestry that deals with measurements of forest stand
Mensural notation of music
Mensuration canon, a musical composition wherein the main melody is accompanied by one or more imitations of that melody in other voices